Glenwood is a census-designated place (CDP) in Buffalo County, Nebraska, United States. It conforms to the unincorporated area known as Glenwood Park. It is part of the Kearney, Nebraska Micropolitan Statistical Area. The population was 466 at the 2010 census.

History
A post office was established at Glenwood Park in 1892, was renamed Glenwood in 1894, and remained in operation until it was discontinued in 1900. Glenwood Park was named from a local park.

Geography
Glenwood is located in southern Buffalo County, directly north of Kearney, the county seat. Nebraska Highway 10 leads through the center of the CDP, connecting Kearney to the south with Pleasanton  to the north.

Demographics

References

Census-designated places in Buffalo County, Nebraska
Census-designated places in Nebraska
Kearney Micropolitan Statistical Area